Hofgeismar-Hümme is a railway station located in Hümme, Germany. The station is located on the Kassel–Warburg railway. The train services are operated by RegioTram Gesellschaft (RTG).

Train services 
The following services currently call at the station:

Tram-train services  Hofgeismar-Hümme - Kassel - City Centre - Hollandische Straße

References

Railway stations in Hesse